Eli Cohen (born 6 April 1961) is an Israeli football manager and former player.

Career

Playing career
During the 1980s (While playing at Maccabi Haifa), Cohen had won two championships.

Management career
In 2003 Cohen won the Israel State Cup as manager of Hapoel Ramat Gan.

At the beginning of 2004, Cohen was sacked from Hapoel Ramat Gan following a dispute with the team chairman. Cohen moved to coach Hapoel Tzafririm Holon, which he played in the past. During his time the team went down to Liga Alef, but eventually stayed in Liga Leumit due to Maccabi Kiryat Gat heavy debts. In 2005 Holon relegated back to Liga Alef.

At the beginning of 2006, Cohen was called to manage Hapoel Ra'anana, which was in last place in Liga Leumit. At the end of the season he managed to remain in the league, and in 2009, Cohen was able to promote the team to the Israeli Premier League for the team first time. In March 2010, Cohen was sacked from Hapoel Ra'anana after four years at the club, after the team struggled in the relegation places.

During the Summer of 2010, he was signed in Hapoel Acre, and helped to team avoid relegation.

Honours

As a Player
Israeli Premier League (2):
1983-84, 1984–85
Second Division (2):
1986–87, 1989–90

As a Manager
Toto Cup (Artzit) (1):
1999–2000
Israel State Cup (2):
2003, 2013

References

1961 births
Living people
Israeli Jews
Israeli footballers
Maccabi Haifa F.C. players
Hapoel Tzafririm Holon F.C. players
Liga Leumit players
Israeli football managers
Hapoel Ramat Gan F.C. managers
Maccabi Herzliya F.C. managers
Hapoel Tzafririm Holon F.C. managers
Hapoel Ra'anana A.F.C. managers
Hapoel Acre F.C. managers
Beitar Jerusalem F.C. managers
Bnei Sakhnin F.C. managers
Hapoel Haifa F.C. managers
Hapoel Kfar Saba F.C. managers
Hapoel Nir Ramat HaSharon F.C. managers
Israeli Premier League managers
Association football defenders